The 1910–11 City Cup was the seventeenth edition of the City Cup, a cup competition in Irish football.

The tournament was won by Glentoran for the third time.

Group standings

References

1910–11 in Irish association football